The 2022 Meath Senior Football Championship was the 130th edition of the Meath GAA's premier club Gaelic football tournament for senior clubs in County Meath, Ireland with 16 teams competing. The winner will represent Meath in the Leinster Senior Club Football Championship. The championship starts with a group stage and then progresses to a knock out stage.

Wolfe Tones are the defending champions after they defeated St. Peter's, Dunboyne in the 2022 final to claim their second S.F.C. crown and their first since 2006.

In 2021, Trim won the I.F.C. to return to the Senior Football Championship for the first time since 2011.

The draw for the group stages of the championship was made on 9 May 2022 with the games due to commence on 5 August 2022.

On 16 October 2022, Ratoath won the Keegan Cup by beating Summerhill 0-12 to 0-11 in the final. This was Ratoath's 3rd third Meath Senior Football Championship in their history and their third title in four years. Jack Flynn was awarded man of the match.
Navan O'Mahony's were relegated to the Meath Intermediate Football Championship after losing to Seneschalstown in the relegation playoff final. They will compete at intermediate level for the first time since winning the Intermediate Football Championship in 2003 and only 8 years after their latest Keegan Cup win in 2015.

Championship Structure
The 2022 Meath S.F.C. consists of 16 teams drawn into four groups each containing four teams. The top two teams progress to the quarter-finals, while the bottom two in each group contest the Relegation Quarter-Finals. The losers of each Relegation Quarter-Final then contest the Relegation Semi-Finals, the losers of which will play-off for the right to retain their senior status into 2021.

Team Changes
The following teams have changed division since the 2021 championship season.

To S.F.C.
Promoted from 2021 I.F.C.
 Trim - (Intermediate Champions)

From S.F.C.
Relegated to 2022 I.F.C.
 Dunshaughlin

Participating teams
The teams taking part in the 2022 Meath Senior Football Championship are:

Group stage 

There are four groups of four teams called Group A, B, C and D. The 1st and 2nd placed teams in each group qualify for the quarter-finals.
The 3rd and 4th placed team in each group will proceed to the Relegation Play-Off to determine which team will suffer relegation.

The draw for the group stages of the championship was made on 9 May 2022.

Tiebreakers:
If two or more teams were equal on points on completion of the group matches, the following tie-breaking criteria would be applied:

All Football Championships and Leagues shall be run on a combination of a league and knockout basis under Rule 6.21 T.O. Where teams finish equal with points for qualification or relegation process for concluding stages, the positioning shall be decided as follows;

 (i) Where three teams are involved - the outcome of the meetings of the three teams in their previous games in the competition. If three teams finish level on points for three places and one team has beaten the other two teams that team qualifies in first place and other places are determined by the specified order. If there are two positions and one team has beaten the other two teams that team qualifies and the second place is determined by the specified order. If there is one position and one team has beaten the other two team that team qualifies;
 (ii) Where two teams are involved - the outcome of the meeting of the two teams in the previous game in the competition;
 (iii) Scoring Difference;
 (iv) Highest total scores for;
 (v) A play-off.

Group A

Round 1
 Wolfe Tones 3-9, 0-12 Skryne, Páirc Tailteann, 5/8/2022
 Seneschalstown 4-11, 0-16 St. Colmcille's, Ardcath, 6/8/2022

Round 2
 Skryne 1-13, 2-3 Seneschalstown, Walterstown, 20/8/2022
 St. Colmcille's 0-10, 1-12 Wolfe Tones, Ashbourne, 21/8/2022

Round 3
 St. Colmcille's 2-11, 0-16 Skryne, Stamullen, 4/9/2022
 Wolfe Tones 4-9, 0-8 Seneschalstown, Simonstown, 4/9/2022

Group B

Round 1
 Moynalvey 0-15, 0-7 Curraha, Skryne, 6/8/2022
 Trim 6-13, 1-13 Navan O'Mahony's, Páirc Tailteann, 7/8/2022

Round 2
 Curraha 0-5 , 2-15 Trim, Dunsany, 20/8/2022
 Navan O'Mahony's 0-13, 2-14 Moynalvey, Skryne, 21/8/2022

Round 3
 Navan O'Mahony's 1-16, 2-10 Curraha, Seneschalstown, 3/9/2022
 Moynalvey 1-5, 4-17 Trim, Summerhill, 3/9/2022

Group C

Round 1
 Gaeil Colmcille 0-16, 2-7 Donaghmore/Ashbourne, Páirc Tailteann, 7/8/2022
 Ratoath 5-16, 3-14 Simonstown Gaels, Ashbourne, 7/8/2022

Round 2
 Simonstown Gaels 0-11, 1-18 Gaeil Colmcille, Páirc Tailteann, 20/8/2022
Donaghmore/Ashbourne 1-13, 4-15 Ratoath, Dunshaughlin, 21/8/2022

Round 3
 Donaghmore/Ashbourne 3-11, 0-7 Simonstown Gaels, Duleek, 2/9/2022
 Ratoath 1-11, 1-9 Gaeil Colmcille, Skryne, 2/9/2022

Group D

Round 1
 St. Peter's Dunboyne 0-8, 2-11 Summerhill, Trim, 5/8/2022
 Ballinabrackey 1-10, 2-14 Na Fianna, Clonard, 6/8/2022

Round 2
 Summerhill 1-11, 0-8 Ballinabrackey, Clonard, 20/8/2022
 Na Fianna 0-16, 1-10 St. Peter's Dunboyne, Kilcloon, 21/8/2022

Round 3
 Na Fianna 0-12, Summerhill 2-9, Trim, 4/9/2022
 St. Peter's Dunboyne 1-6, 4-6 Ballinabrackey, Páirc Tailteann, 4/9/2022

Knock-Out Stage

The 1st and 2nd placed teams in each group qualify for the quarter-finals. Quarter Final pairings were drawn with one group winner and one 2nd placed team in each pair with no repeat pairings from group stages. Semi Final pairings were determined by an open draw. The draw for the quarter-finals and Semi-Finals took place on 5th September 2022.

Quarter-finals

Semi-finals

Final

Relegation play-off
The Relegation Play-Off consisted of the 3rd and 4th-placed finishers in each group. The winners of each playoff retained their senior status while the outright loser was relegated to the Intermediate championship for 2023. The draw for the relegation playoffs took place on 5th September 2022.

Relegation Quarter-Finals

Relegation Semi-Finals

Relegation Final

References

External links

Meath SFC
Meath Senior Football Championship
Meath Senior Football Championship